María de Cazalla, was a Spanish mystic.   

She was a member of the Alumbrados movement. 

She was the subject of a long heresy trial by the Spanish Inquisition, lasting between 1525 and 1534. 

When the process was opened against Toledo's lights, he was interrogated by the Inquisition in 1525 and entered prison in 1532. His process lasted until December 1534, and it combined Lutheranism, erasmism and lighting. She was subjected to the foal and touches her, and kept her gagged part of the time of her captivity. She finally was acquitted of the most serious charges, subject to public shame in a church in Guadalajara and fined one hundred ducats, prohibited from keeping contact with her old relations.

References

16th-century Spanish people
16th-century Spanish women
People charged with heresy